In enzymology, a S-methyl-5-thioribose-1-phosphate isomerase is an enzyme that catalyzes the chemical reaction

S-methyl-5-thio-alpha-D-ribose 1-phosphate  S-methyl-5-thio-D-ribulose 1-phosphate

Hence, this enzyme has one substrate, S-methyl-5-thio-alpha-D-ribose 1-phosphate, and one product, S-methyl-5-thio-D-ribulose 1-phosphate.

This enzyme belongs to the family of isomerases, specifically those intramolecular oxidoreductases interconverting aldoses and ketoses.  The systematic name of this enzyme class is S-methyl-5-thio-alpha-D-ribose-1-phosphate aldose-ketose-isomerase. Other names in common use include methylthioribose 1-phosphate isomerase, 1-PMTR isomerase, 5-methylthio-5-deoxy-D-ribose-1-phosphate ketol-isomerase, S-methyl-5-thio-5-deoxy-D-ribose-1-phosphate ketol-isomerase, S-methyl-5-thio-5-deoxy-D-ribose-1-phosphate, aldose-ketose-isomerase, 1-phospho-5'-S-methylthioribose isomerase, and S-methyl-5-thio-D-ribose-1-phosphate aldose-ketose-isomerase.  This enzyme participates in methionine metabolism.

Structural studies

References

 
 
 

EC 5.3.1
Enzymes of known structure